Javier "Javi" Díaz Sánchez (born 15 May 1997) is a Spanish professional footballer who plays for CD Tenerife as a goalkeeper.

Club career

Sevilla
Born in Mairena del Aljarafe, Province of Seville, Andalusia, Díaz represented Sevilla FC as a youth. He made his senior debut with the C side on 3 April 2016, starting in a 1–0 Tercera División away loss against CD Cabecense.

Ahead of the 2018–19 season, Díaz was promoted to the reserves in Segunda División B. He played his first match in La Liga with the first team on 31 March 2019, starting in a 0–1 home defeat to Valencia CF as starter Tomáš Vaclík was injured and backup Juan Soriano suspended.

Tenerife
On 7 July 2022, Díaz signed a three-year contract with Segunda División club CD Tenerife.

Career statistics

References

External links

1997 births
Living people
People from Aljarafe
Sportspeople from the Province of Seville
Spanish footballers
Footballers from Andalusia
Association football goalkeepers
La Liga players
Segunda División B players
Tercera División players
Primera Federación players
Sevilla FC C players
Sevilla Atlético players
Sevilla FC players
CD Tenerife players